is a train station on the Hiroden Miyajima Line located in Inokuchi, Nishi-ku, Hiroshima.

Routes
 Hiroshima Station - Hiroden-miyajima-guchi Route

Connections
█ Miyajima Line

Inokuchi — Shudai-kyoso-chuko-mae — Hiroden-itsukaichi

Around station

Suzugamine Women's College
Suzugamine Girls' Junior High School & High School
Hiroshima Municipal Suzugamine Elementary School
Hiroshima Institute of Technology Senior High School

History
Opened as "Jissen-jogakkō-mae" on July 4, 1941.
Renamed to "Suzugamine-josen-mae" on April 1, 1947.
Renamed to "Suzugamine-joshidai-mae" on April 1, 1950.
Renamed to "Shudaifuzoku-suzugamine-mae" on April 1, 2015.
Renamed to "Shudai-kyoso-chuko-mae" on April 1, 2019.

See also
Hiroden Streetcar Lines and Routes

References

External links
Inokuchi Town Map

Suzugamine-joshidai-mae Station
Railway stations in Japan opened in 1941